The 2012 Korea Open was a women's professional tennis tournament played on hard courts. It was the ninth edition of the tournament which was part of the 2012 WTA Tour. It took place in Seoul, South Korea between 17 and 23 September 2012.

Singles main-draw entrants

Seeds

 1 Rankings are as of September 10, 2012

Other entrants
The following players received wildcards into the singles main draw:
  Hong Hyun-hui
  Lee So-ra
  Han Sung-hee

The following players received entry from the qualifying draw:
  Eleni Daniilidou
  Caroline Garcia
  Jamie Hampton
  Sesil Karatantcheva

Withdrawals
  Ksenia Pervak
  Sloane Stephens

Retirements
  Maria Kirilenko (back injury)
  Nadia Petrova (back injury)

Doubles main-draw entrants

Seeds

1 Rankings are as of September 10, 2012

Other entrants
The following pairs received wildcards into the doubles main draw:
  Choi Ji-hee /  Jun Nam-yeon
  Han Sung-hee /  Lee So-ra

Finals

Singles

 Caroline Wozniacki defeated  Kaia Kanepi 6–1, 6–0
This was Wozniacki's first title of the season which ended a 13-month drought. It was also her 19th career title.

Doubles

 Raquel Kops-Jones /  Abigail Spears defeated  Akgul Amanmuradova /  Vania King 2–6, 6–2, [10–8]

External links
Official Website
Singles, Doubles, and Qualifying Singles draws

Korea Open
Korea Open (tennis)
September 2012 sports events in South Korea